Lonnie Perrin (February 3, 1952 – January 7, 2021) was an American football running back in the National Football League (NFL) for the Denver Broncos, the Chicago Bears, and the Washington Redskins. He played college football at the University of Illinois and was drafted in the fifth round of the 1976 NFL Draft. He played in Super Bowl XII with the Broncos.

Perrin died on January 7, 2021, in Clinton, Maryland, at age 68.

References

1952 births
2021 deaths
American football running backs
Chicago Bears players
Denver Broncos players
Illinois Fighting Illini football players
Washington Redskins players
Players of American football from Norfolk, Virginia